Peter Ludlow, 1st Earl Ludlow PC (21 April 1730 – 26 October 1803), known as The Lord Ludlow between 1755 and 1760, was a British politician. He served as Comptroller of the Household from 1782 to 1784.

Background
Ludlow was the son of Peter Ludlow and Mary, daughter of John Preston, of Ardsalla, County Meath (of the Viscounts Gormanston). He was the grandson of Stephen Ludlow, who represented several constituencies in the Irish House of Commons, and the great-grandson of Henry Ludlow, brother of the Parliamentarian general Edmund Ludlow.

Political career
In 1755 Ludlow, then aged only 25, was elevated to the Peerage of Ireland as Baron Ludlow, of Ardsalla in the County of Meath. Five years later he was further honoured when he was made Viscount Preston, of Ardsalla in the County of Meath, and Earl Ludlow, both in the Peerage or Ireland. Lord Ludlow remained eligible to stand for election to the House of Commons and in 1768 he was returned for Huntingdonshire, a seat he would hold for the next 28 years. In 1782 he was sworn of the Privy Council and appointed Comptroller of the Household, a post he held until 1784.

Family
Lord Ludlow married Lady Frances, eldest daughter of Thomas Lumley-Saunderson, 3rd Earl of Scarbrough, in 1753. They had two sons and four daughters. They lived at Great Staughton Manor in Huntingdonshire.

He died in October 1803, aged 73, and was succeeded in the earldom by his eldest son, Augustus. Ludlow's second son George, the third Earl, was a General in the British Army.

References

1730 births
1803 deaths
1
Peter
Members of the Privy Council of Great Britain
Members of the Parliament of Great Britain for English constituencies
British MPs 1768–1774
British MPs 1774–1780
British MPs 1780–1784
British MPs 1784–1790
British MPs 1790–1796
Peers of Ireland created by George II